Sofía Denise Villarroya (born 10 July 1992) is an Argentinian field hockey player.

Hockey career 
Villarroya was part of the Argentina Junior National Team at the 2013 Junior World Cup where the team won the silver medal.

In 2014, VIllarroya took part of the senior national team.

References

Living people
1992 births
Argentine female field hockey players
Sportspeople from Rosario, Santa Fe